Gallery was an American soft rock band, formed in Detroit, Michigan by Jim Gold. While Gallery did record a number of songs, they are most famous for their 1972 hit single "Nice to Be with You", written by Gold.  The song was arranged and produced by Dennis Coffey and Mike Theodore and released by Sussex Records. It became an international hit single, reaching the top five in the U.S., Canada, Australia, and New Zealand; sales of one million copies earned the band a gold record.
The song reached No. 4 on the U.S. Billboard Hot 100 and remained in the Hot 100 for 22 weeks, tying with War's "Slippin' into Darkness" for most weeks on the chart during 1972. Billboard ranked it as the No. 14 song for 1972.  "Nice to Be with You" reached No. 1 on Cashbox, WCFL, and WLS.

Gallery followed up a few months later with a cover of Mac Davis's "I Believe in Music", which charted moderately well at No. 22 on Billboard and No. 13 on Cashbox.
They also toured across the South Pacific.

In early 1973, Gallery's third and last Hot 100 hit, Tom Lazaros's "Big City Miss Ruth Ann", reached No. 23 on the Hot 100, No. 12 on Cashbox, and No. 7 on WCFL.  A remake of The Crickets' "Maybe Baby" "Bubbled Under" at No. 118 in July 1973.

In early 1974 "Friends" / "Love Every Little Thing About You" failed to chart.  Gallery disbanded, and Gold embarked on a solo career.

Discography

Albums

Singles

References

External links
 [ Biography at Allmusic.com]
 Official Web Site of Jim Gold

1971 establishments in Michigan
1974 disestablishments in Michigan
Rock music groups from Michigan
American pop music groups
American soft rock music groups
Musical groups established in 1971
Musical groups disestablished in 1974
Musical groups from Detroit